Mourecochylis is a genus of moths belonging to the family Tortricidae.

Species
Mourecochylis affecta (Razowski, 1986)
Mourecochylis dentipara Razowski & Becker, 2002
Mourecochylis limenarchis Razowski, 1986
Mourecochylis mimosina (Razowski, 1986)
Mourecochylis ramosa Razowski & Becker, 1983
Mourecochylis stibeutes (Razowski, 1992)

See also
List of Tortricidae genera

References

 , 2011: Diagnoses and remarks on genera of Tortricidae, 2: Cochylini (Lepidoptera: Tortricidae). Shilap Revista de Lepidopterologia 39 (156): 397–414.
 , 2002: Systematic and faunistic data on Neotropical Cochylini (Lepidoptera: Tortricidae), with descriptions of new species. Part.1. Acta zool. cracov. 45: 287-316

External links
tortricidae.com

Cochylini
Tortricidae genera